The Henry Ford II World Center, also commonly known as the Ford World Headquarters and popularly known as the Glass House, is the administrative headquarters for Ford Motor Company, a 12-story, glass-faced office building designed to accommodate a staff of approximately 3,000. The building is located at 1 American Road at Michigan Avenue in Dearborn, Michigan, near Ford's historic Rouge plant, Greenfield Village, the Henry Ford Museum, Dearborn's Henry Ford Centennial Library, and Fair Lane, Henry Ford's personal estate.

In 2008, columnist George Will said the building opened at "the peak of American confidence" and described the headquarters as having a "sleek glass-and-steel minimalism that characterized up-to-date architecture in the 1950s, when America was at the wheel of the world and even buildings seemed streamlined for speed".

While under design and construction, the building was called the "Central Staff Office Building" and was later referred to as the "New Central Office Building" to distinguish it from the company's prior headquarters nearby, known as the Administration Building, which was located at 3000 Schaefer, directly across from the Ford Rotunda building. The building was later referred to as the "Ford Motor Company Administrative Center" and was formally renamed the Henry Ford II World Center in June 1996.

In early 2016, Ford announced a redesign of the headquarters building and its surrounding campus,
scheduled to begin in 2021 and projected to connect the Glass House to a series of new and existing buildings, parking decks, soccer fields and an arboretum.

Design and construction
Formally announced in 1950, the new Central Staff Office Building was delayed by construction moratoriums in place during the Korean War. Construction broke ground on September 29, 1953 and the building was dedicated on September 26, 1956.

In addition to the prominent 12-story office building, the Glass House includes an adjacent three-story structure accommodating an employee cafeteria, dining rooms and parking garage for 1500 cars—the two elements connected by a  concourse. The headquarters was designed in the International Style by noted architects Gordon Bunshaft and Natalie de Blois, both with the firm Skidmore, Owings & Merrill. De Blois designed the three-story portion of the complex.

Described as a "tall city in a park," the complex was master planned by William L. Pereira and Associates of Los Angeles, requiring multiple entry points to adequately serve the concentrated daily influx of cars.

To maximize interior flexibility, structural columns are located outside the exterior curtain wall or within the building's core, providing a clear interior span for office space.

The long side of the building's rooftop mechanical penthouse screen walls originally featured the word "FORD" in tall block lettering–later replaced with the company's trademark Blue Oval logo. In 1999, the company replaced the "Blue Oval" at the penthouse screen wall with the words "Ford Motor Company" in the company's original trademark script, referred to by Ford as the "trustmark". Ford returned the "Blue Oval" again to the penthouse screenwalls in 2003, in time for the company's centennial.

Background and awards

Prior to the Glass House, Ford's central staff occupied a headquarters, the 3000 Schaefer Building, constructed in 1928 at the corner of Schaefer Road and what is now Rotunda Drive in Dearborn. The building was subsequently occupied by the Lincoln Mercury division after completion of the Glass House, later became the Ford Parts Department and was ultimately razed in 1997.

The Skidmore Owings & Merrill 1956 headquarters building won the Office of the Year Award from Administrative Management Magazine in 1956 and in 1967 an Award of Excellence from the American Institute of Steel Construction.

Artwork and illuminations

In 1955, Skidmore Owings & Merrill, architects of the Glass House, commissioned an  sculpture, a welded metal screen, by artist Thomas Fulton McClure (1920–2009) for its new headquarters, while the building was still under construction—and at the time called the "Central Staff Office Building".

For the 1996 rechristening of the building, Ford commissioned a full-size bronze statue of Henry Ford II by artist Richard R. Miller. The sculpture stands in the building's lobby and depicts Henry Ford II in an informal standing pose.

On the evening of September 15, 2008, the office lights at Ford World Headquarters were "strategically" illuminated to spell "Happy 100 GM," in honor of its chief rival General Motors' 100th anniversary.

In 2009, Ford illuminated the facade of the Glass House in pink for two nights, in support of the Susan G. Komen for the Cure cancer awareness program.

See also

General Motors Technical Center
FCA US LLC Headquarters and Technology Center
Ford Rotunda
Greenfield Village
Fair Lane
Highland Park Ford Plant
Ford River Rouge Complex

References

External links
 

Buildings and structures in Dearborn, Michigan
Automobile culture and history in Dearborn, Michigan
Ford Motor Company facilities
Skidmore, Owings & Merrill buildings
Office buildings completed in 1956
1956 establishments in Michigan
Corporate headquarters in the United States